The San Diego Film Critics Society Award for Best Performance by an Ensemble (formerly for Best Cast) is an annual film award given by the San Diego Film Critics Society.

Winners

2000s

2010s

2020s

External links
San Diego Film Critics Society - Awards

References

Film awards for Best Cast